The following list contains information about organists at Church of England cathedrals in England.

The cathedrals of England have a long history of liturgical music, often played on or accompanied by the organ. The role of the cathedral organist is a salaried appointment, the organist often also serving as choirmaster. There is often also an assistant organist and an organ scholar.

Birmingham, St Philip's Cathedral
Organists at St Philip's Cathedral, Birmingham have included composers Charles John Blood Meacham, Richard Yates Mander and Rupert Jeffcoat.

Directors of Music

 1715 Barnabas Gunn
 1733? William de St. Thunes
 1735? John Ohio Eversman
 1765 Jeremiah Clark (afterwards organist of Worcester Cathedral)
 1803 Bishop Simms
 1829 Henry Simms
 1871 Charles John Blood Meacham (later organist of St. George's Church, Edgbaston)
 1888 Richard Yates Mander (later organist of All Saints' Church, Ryde)
 1898 A. G. Thompson
 1901 Arthur Elmore (later organist of St Mary the Virgin, Acocks Green)
 1906 Edwin Stephenson (later organist of St. Margaret's Church, Westminster)
 1914  William Frederick Dunnill (formerly organist of St. Mary's Church, Nottingham)
 1936 Willis Grant  (later professor of music, University of Bristol)
 1958  Thomas Tunnard
 1968 Roy Massey (later organist of Hereford Cathedral)
 1974 David Bruce-Payne
 1978  Hubert Best
 1986 Marcus Huxley
 2018 David Hardie (Head of Music)

Assistant Organists

 1907–1914 T. Appleby Matthews
 1950–1951  Harrison Oxley, (later Organist of St Edmundsbury Cathedral)
 1954–1956  John K. Nicholas
 Malcolm Hicks
 1966–1968 Roland L. Keen, (later Director of Music at Wroxall Abbey School)
 1968–1974 John Pryer
 Hubert Best (later organist)
 1978–1979 Gary Cole
 Timothy Storey
 1986–1995 Rosemary Field
 1995–1997 Rupert Jeffcoat, (later Director of Music at Coventry Cathedral and St John's Cathedral, Brisbane)
 1997–2004 Christopher Allsop, (later Assistant Organist at Worcester Cathedral)
 2004–2010 Stuart Nicholson, (later Organist and Master of Choristers at St Patrick's Cathedral, Dublin)
 2010–2014 Tim Harper
 2014–2018 David Hardie (later Head of Music – Birmingham Cathedral)
 2019– Ashley Wagner (Assistant Head of Music)

Blackburn Cathedral
Notable organists at Blackburn Cathedral have included Charles Hylton Stewart, John Bertalot and Gordon Stewart.

Directors of Music

 1828–1831 Joseph John Harris (later organist of Manchester Cathedral)
 1832 R. Nimmo (temporary)
 1832–1838 Henry Smart
 1838–1840 John Bishop (formerly organist of St. Paul's Church, Cheltenham)
 1840–1848 William Robinson
 1848–1858 Joseph Rolley (from Church of St George, Bolton)
 1858–1863 Charles Greenwood
 1863–1870 James H. Robinson
 1870–1882 Thomas S. Hayward (previously organist of St Peter's Collegiate Church Wolverhampton, afterwards organist of Wesleyan Chapel, Mornington Road, Southport)
 1882–1888 Walter Handel Thorley
 1888–1900 James H. Rooks
 1900–1912 Christie Green (afterwards organist of Holy Trinity Church, Coventry)
 1912–1914 Richard Henry Coleman
 1914–1916 Charles Hylton Stewart (afterwards organist of Rochester Cathedral and St George's Chapel, Windsor)
 1916–1939 Herman Brearley
 1939–1964 Thomas Lucas Duerden
 1964–1983 John Bertalot
 1983–1994 David Anthony Cooper
 1994–1998 Gordon Stewart
 1998–2011 Richard Tanner (from All Saints' Church, Northampton)
 2011–2019 Samuel Hudson
 2019–     John Robinson

Organist in Residence 

 2022- John Hosking (formerly Director of Music, Holy Trinity, Southport)

Assistant Directors of Music 

 Justin Waters
 James Thomas
 Benjamin Saunders
 Robert Costin
 David Goodenough
 Tim Cooke
 2000–2006 Greg Morris
 2006–2012 James Davy
 2012–2021 Shaun Turnbull

Bradford Cathedral
Organists at Bradford Cathedral have included the following.

Organist and Master of the Choristers

 c1861–1893 Absalom Rawnsley Swaine
 1893–1939 Henry Coates
 1939–1963 Charles Hooper
 1963–1981 Keith Vernon Rhodes
 1982–1986 Geoffrey John Weaver
 1986–2002 Alan Graham Horsey
 2003–2011 Andrew Teague

Organist & Director of Music

 2012–2016  Alexander Woodrow
 2017–       Alexander Berry

Cathedral Organist

 2011–2014 Paul Bowen

Sub-Organist & Assistant Director of Music

 1957-1960 Charles Edmondson
 1984-2004 Martin Derek Baker
 1997-2000 Jonathan Kingston
 2004-2011 Paul Bowen
 2009-2012 David Condry
 2012-2016 Jonathan Eyre
 2016-2018 Jon Payne
 2019- Graham Thorpe

Associate Organist

 2018–2019 Ed Jones

Bristol Cathedral
Organists at Bristol Cathedral have included the writer and composer  Percy Buck and the conductor Malcolm Archer.

Organists

 1542 Thomas Denny
 1588 Elway Bevin
 1638 Arthur Phillips
 1639 Thomas Deane
 1680 Paul Heath
 1724 Nathaniel Priest
 1734 James Morley
 1756 George Coombes
 1759 Edward Higgins
 1765 George Coombes
 1769 Edward Rooke
 1773 Samuel Mineard
 1778 Richard Langdon
 1781 Rice Wasbrough
 1825 John Davies Corfe
 1876 George Riseley
 1899 Percy Carter Buck
 1901 Hubert Hunt
 1946 Reginald Alwyn Surplice
 1949 Clifford Harker
 1983 Malcolm Archer
 1990 Christopher Brayne
 1998 Mark Lee

Assistant Organists

 1856–1860 John Barrett
 1862–1876 George Riseley
 Albert Edward New
 1888–1892 J.H. Fulford
 1902 Arthur S. Warrell
 1920–1941 Geoffrey Leonard Mendham
 1956-1959 Lionel Pike
 Stephen Taylor
 John Jenkin
 1980–1986 Martin Schellenberg (later Director of Music of Christchurch Priory)
 1986–1989 Tony Pinel
 1989–1991 Claire Hobbs
 1991–1994 Ian Ball
 1994–2001 David Hobourn
 2001–  Paul Walton

Canterbury Cathedral
Organists and Assistant Organists at Canterbury Cathedral have included composers Clement Charlton Palmer, Gerald Hocken Knight and Philip Moore and musical directors Sidney Campbell, Allan Wicks and Stephen Darlington.

Organists

 1407 John Mounds
 1420 William Stanys
 1445 John Cranbroke
 1499 Thomas Seawall
 1534 John Wodynsborowe
 1547 William Selby
 1553 Thomas Bull
 1583 Matthew Godwin
 1590 Thomas Stores
 1598 George Marson
 1631 Valentine Rother
 1640 Thomas Tunstall
 1661 Thomas Gibbes
 1669 Richard Chomley
 1692 Nicholas Wotton
 1697 William Porter
 1698 Daniel Henstridge
 1736 William Raylton
 1757 Samuel Porter
 1803 Highmore Skeats
 1831 Thomas Jones
 1873 William Henry Longhurst
 1886 Dr Albert Lister Peace
 1898 Harry Crane Perrin
 1908 Clement Charlton Palmer
 1937 Gerald Hocken Knight
 1953 Douglas Edward Hopkins
 1956 Sidney Campbell
 1961 Allan Wicks
 1988 David Flood
 2020 David Newsholme (acting)
 2021 David Newsholme

Assistant Organists

 1836 William Henry Longhurst
 1873 John Browning Lott
 1875 ?
 1884 Herbert Austin Fricker
 1892  J. Sterndale Grundy
 1906 W. T. Harvey
 1909 Frank Charles Butcher
 1918 Rene Soames
 1926 ?
 1936 Henry Frank Cole
 1938 ?
 1953 John Malcolm Tyler
 1956 Gwilym Isaac
 1964 Stephen Crisp
 1968 Philip Moore
 1974 Stephen Darlington
 1978 David Flood
 1986 Michael Harris
 1997 Timothy Noon
 2001 Matthew Martin
 2005 Robert Patterson
 2008 John Robinson
 2010 Simon Lawford (acting)
 2011 David Newsholme
 2020 Adrian Bawtree (acting)
 2022 Jamie Rogers

Second Assistant Organists

 2015 Adrian Bawtree
 2020 Jamie Rogers (acting)
 2022 Adrian Bawtree

Carlisle Cathedral

Notable organists at Carlisle Cathedral have included the composer, astronomer and mathematician Thomas Greatorex and founder of the Royal School of Church Music, Sir Sydney Nicholson.

Organists

 1560 Thomas Southick
 1587 Robert James
 1610 James Pearson
 1630 Robert Dalton
 1663 John How
 1693 Timothy How
 1734 Abraham Dobinson
 1749 Charles Pick
 1781 Thomas Greatorex (later organist at Westminster Abbey).
 1785 Thomas Hill
 1833 Richard Ingham
 1841 James Stimpson (later Birmingham City Organist and organist of St Martin in the Bull Ring, Birmingham)
 1842 Henry Edmund Ford
 1903 E. G. Mercer
 1904 Sydney Nicholson (later Sir Sydney Nicholson organist of Westminster Abbey and founder of the Royal School of Church Music)
 1910 Frederick William Wadely
 1960 Robert Andrew Seivewright
 1991 Jeremy Suter
 2017 Mark Duthie

Assistant Organists

 1900–1902 Stanley G. P. Stubbs  (later Acting Organist)
 1915–1919 Charles Frederick Eastwood
 1932–1934 G. F. Stuart
 1940–1945 Keith Burton-Nickson
 William L. Snowdon
 Ifor James
 1970–1973 Christopher Rathbone
 1974–1985 Hugh Davies
 1985–1987 Andrew Shaw
 1987–1989 Andrew Sackett
 1989–1995 Ian Hare
 1995–1999 Charles Harrison (later organist of Chichester Cathedral)
 2000–2005 David Gibbs
 2005–2008 John Robinson (Organist and Choir Director)
 2008–present Edward Taylor   (formerly Assistant Organist to Ely Cathedral Girls' Choir)

Chelmsford Cathedral
Notable organists at Chelmsford Cathedral have included Stanley Vann and Philip Ledger.

Masters of the Music

 182? Charles Ambrose
 1876 Frederick Frye
 1945 Roland Middleton (later Organist of Chester Cathedral)
 1949 Stanley Vann (later Master of the Music at Peterborough Cathedral)
 1953 Derrick Edward Cantrell (later Organist of Manchester Cathedral)
 1962 Philip Ledger (later Director of Music at King's College, Cambridge)
 1965 John Willam Jordan
 1981 Graham Elliott
 1999 Peter Nardone (later Organist and Director of Music at Worcester Cathedral)
 2012 James Davy [job title changed to Organist and Master of the Choristers in 2013]

Assistant Organists

     Geoffrey Becket
 1963 John Jordan
 1966 Peter Cross
 1968 David Sparrow
 1986 Timothy Allen
 1991 Neil Weston

Assistant Directors of Music

 1999 Edward Wellman
 2003 Robert Poyser (later Director of Music at Beverley Minster)
 2008 Tom Wilkinson (later Organist at the University of St Andrews, Scotland)
 2009 Oliver Waterer (later Organist at St. David's Cathedral)
 2013 Laurence Lyndon-Jones
 2019 Hilary Punnett

Chester Cathedral
Notable organists of Chester Cathedral include the composers  Robert White and  John Sanders and the recording artist Roger Fisher.

Organists

 1541 John Brycheley
 1551 Thomas Barnes
 1558 Richard Saywell
 1567 Robert White
 1570 Robert Stevenson
 1599 Thomas Bateson
 1609 John Alien
 1613 Michael Done
 1614 Thomas Jones
 1637 Richard Newbold
 1642 Randolph Jewitt
 1661 Rev. Peter Stringer
 1673 John Stringer
 1686 William Key
 1699 John Mounterratt
 1705 Edmund White
 1715 Samuel Davies
 1726 Benjamin Worrall
 1727 Edmund Baker
 1765 Edward Orme
 1776 John Bailey
 1803 Edward Bailey
 1823 George Black
 1824 Thomas Haylett
 1841 Frederick Gunton
 1877 Joseph Cox Bridge
 1925 John Thomas Hughes
 1930 Charles Hylton Stewart
 1932 Malcolm Courtenay Boyle
 1949 James Roland Middleton
 1964 John Sanders
 1967 Roger Fisher
 1997 David Poulter
 2008 Philip Rushforth

Assistant Organists

 1857 Mr. Munns
 1872–1876 Herbert Stephen Irons
 1876–1877 Joseph Cox Bridge  (then organist)
 ????–1890 John Gumi
 1893–1925 John Thomas Hughes  (then organist)
 1925–1926 Guillaume Ormond  (later organist of Truro Cathedral)
 1934–1944 James Roland Middleton  (later organist of Chelmsford Cathedral)
 1944–1947 George Guest (later organist of St John's College, Cambridge)
 1955–1960 Brian Runnett (later organist of Norwich Cathedral)
 1960–1962 Peter Gilbert White
 1962–1967 Harold Hullah
 1967–1971 John Belcher
 1971–1974 John Cooper Green
 1974-1976 Gwyn Hodgson
 1976–1978 John Keys
 1978–1980 Simon Russell
 1980–1984 Martin Singleton
 1984–1986 David Holroyd
 1986–1989 Lee Ward
 1989–1998 Graham Eccles
 1998–2002 Benjamin Saunders
 2003–2008 Philip Rushforth (later organist)
 2008–2011 Ian Roberts
 2011–2016 Benjamin Chewter
 2016–2020 Andrew Wyatt

Chichester Cathedral
Notable organists at Chichester Cathedral have included composer Thomas Weelkes and conductors John Birch and Nicholas Cleobury.

Until 1801, there were two distinct posts, 'Organist' and 'Master of the Choristers', which were merged upon the appointment of James Target. Since the mid-nineteenth century, there has existed the role of Assistant Organist. Currently, the 'Organist and Master of the Choristers' is responsible for the direction of the choir and cathedral liturgy, and the 'Assistant Organist' accompanies the choir.

The sacking of Chichester Cathedral in December 1642 caused all cathedral services to be suspended. They were not resumed until the restoration of the monarchy in 1661. The choir was re-formed in the same year, but the appointment of a new organist did not occur until 1668.

Organists and Masters of the Choristers

Organist (1545–1801)

 1545 William Campion
 1550 Thomas Coring
 1560 Edward Piper
 1561 Thomas Coring
 1565 Michael Woods
 1571 Clement Woodcock
 1589 ?
 1599 Jacob Hillarye
 1602 Thomas Weelkes
 1623 William Eames
 1636 Thomas Lewis
 1642 None
 1668 Bartholomew Webb
 1673 Thomas Lewis
 1675 John Reading
 1677 Samuel Peirson
 1720 Thomas Kelway
 1744 Thomas Capell
 1776 William Walond Jr. 

Master of the Choristers (1550s – 1801) 

 155? Richard Martyn
 1558 William Payne
 1562 Edward Piper
 1568 William Payne
 1571 Clement Woodcock
 1580 Christopher Paine 
 1589 Clement Woodcock
 1590 John Cowper
 1597 Thomas Lambert
 1599 Jacob Hillarye
 1602 Thomas Weelkes
 1617 John Fidge
 1642 None
 1661 John Floud
 1662 George Hush
 1668 Bartholomew Webb
 1673 John Turner
 1675 John Reading
 1677 ?
 1732 Thomas Capell
 1771 Thomas Tremain
 1775 William Walond Jr.
 1794 Thomas Barber 

Organist and Master of the Choristers (1801 – present)

 1801 James Target
 1803 Thomas Bennett
 1848 Henry R. Bennett
 1861 Philip Armes
 1863 Edward Thorne
 1870 Francis Edward Gladstone
 1873 James Pyne
 1874 Charles Henry Hylton Stewart
 1875 Daniel Wood
 1876 Theodore Aylward
 1887 Frederick Read
 1902 Frederick Crowe
 1921 Frederick Read
 1925 Marmaduke Conway
 1931 Harvey Grace
 1938 Horace Hawkins
 1958 John Birch
 1980 Alan Thurlow
 2008 Sarah Baldock
 2014 Charles Harrison

Assistant Organists

 18?? Wharton Hooper
 1864 ?
 1876 Edward Bartlett
 1887 Hugh Percy Allen
 1892 Percy Algernon Whitehead
 1908 William Herbert H. Lambert
 1911 R. Swanborough
 1915 Cyril Herbert Stone
 1920 ?
 1931 John Edward Snelling-Colyer
 1932 Leonard Fergus O’Connor
 1936 Claude Appleby
 1942 Anne Maddocks
 1949 ?
 1961 Richard Seal
 1968 Michael Davey
 1971 Nicholas Cleobury
 1973 Ian Fox
 1978 Richard Cock
 1980 Kenneth Sweetman
 1981 Jeremy Suter
 1991 James Thomas
 1997 Mark Wardell
 2010 Timothy Ravalde

Coventry Cathedral
This list details only those who have held positions in the new Coventry Cathedral.

Directors of Music

 1961	David Foster Lepine
 1972	Robert Weddle
 1977	Ian Little
 1984	Paul Leddington Wright
 1995	David Poulter (subsequently Organist of Chester Cathedral and Director of Music at Liverpool Cathedral)
 1997	Rupert Jeffcoat (subsequently Director of Music and Organist at St John's Cathedral (Brisbane))
 2005	Alistair Reid (Acting Director of Music)
 2006	Kerry Beaumont
 2020– Rachel Mahon

Assistant Organists

 1960 Martyn Lane
 1962 Michael Burnett
 1964 Robert George Weddle (then Organist)
 1972 J Richard Lowry
 1976 Ian Little (then Organist)
 1977 Paul Leddington Wright (then Organist)
 1984 Timothy Hone
 1988 Chris Argent (then Shrewsbury School)
 1990 David Poulter (then Director of Music; later Director of Music at Liverpool Cathedral)
 1995–2002 Daniel Moult
 2004 Alistair Reid
 2011–2013 Laurence Lyndon-Jones (to Chelmsford Cathedral)
 2018–2020 Rachel Mahon (then Director of Music)

Derby Cathedral
Notable organists at Derby Cathedral have included Arthur Claypole and Wallace Ross.

Organists

 1921 Arthur Griffin Claypole
 1930 Alfred William Wilcock
 1933 George Handel Heath-Gracie
 1958 Wallace Michael Ross
 1983 Peter David Gould
 2015 Hugh Morris
 2019 Alexander Binns

Assistant Organists

 (Alfred) Samuel (Wensley) Baker
 Celyn Kingsbury
 Rodney Tomkins
 1985 Tom Corfield
 2017 Edward Turner

Durham Cathedral
Notable organists at Durham Cathedral have included the composers Thomas Ebdon and Richard Lloyd, organists Philip Armes, John Dykes Bower who went on to St Paul's Cathedral, London, Conrad William Eden and James Lancelot, and choral conductor David Hill.

Organists

 1557 John Brimley
 1576 William Browne
 1588 Robert Masterman
 1594 William Smyth
 1599 William Browne
 1609 Edward Smyth
 1612 Mr Dodson
 1614 Richard Hutchinson
 1661 John Foster
 1677 Alexander Shaw
 1681 William Greggs
 1710 James Heseltine
 1763 Thomas Ebdon
 1811 Charles E. J. Clarke
 1813 William Henshaw
 1862 Philip Armes
 1907 Rev Arnold D. Culley
 1933 John Dykes Bower
 1936 Conrad William Eden
 1974 Richard Lloyd
 1985 James Lancelot
 2017 Daniel Cook

Sub-Organists

 ????–1850 John Matthew Wilson Young,  (later organist of Lincoln Cathedral)
 Thomas Henry Collinson
 ????–1874 J. C. Whitehead
 1895–1903 Revd John Lionel Shirley Dampier Bennett
 1901 F. E. Leatham, 1 (temporary during absence of J. L. Bennett)
 1903–1918 William Ellis,  (later organist of Newcastle Cathedral)
 1918–1919 Basil S. Maine
 1919–1968 Cyril Beaumont Maude
 1968–1972 Bruce Richard Cash
 1973–1980 Alan Thurlow (later Organist Chichester Cathedral)
 1980–1982 David Hill (later successively Organist and Director of Music at Westminster Cathedral, Winchester Cathedral, St John's College, Cambridge and Director of the Bach Choir)
 1982–1991 Ian Shaw
 1991 Ralph Woodward (Acting)
 1991–2011 Keith Wright
 2011–2019 Francesca Massey
 2019–present Joseph Beech

Assistant Organists

 2009–2011 Oliver Brett
 2011–2015 David Ratnanayagam

Ely Cathedral
Organists of Ely Cathedral have included the composers Basil Harwood and Arthur Wills.

Organists

 1453 William Kyng
 1535 Thomas Barcroft
 1541 Christopher Tye
 1562 Robert White
 1567 John Farrant (later organist of Salisbury Cathedral)
 1572 William Fox
 1579 George Barcroft
 1610 John Amner
 1641 Robert Claxton
 1662 John Ferrabosco
 1681 James Hawkins
 1729 Thomas Kempton
 1762 John Elbonn
 1768 David Wood
 1774 James Rogers
 1777 Richard Langdon
 1778 Highmore Skeats (sen.)
 1804 Highmore Skeats (jun.)
 1830 Robert Janes
 1867 Edmund Thomas Chipp
 1887 Basil Harwood
 1892 Thomas Tertius Noble
 1898 Hugh Allen
 1901 Archibald Wilson
 1919 Noel Ponsonby
 1926 Hubert Stanley Middleton
 1931 Marmaduke Conway
 1949 Sidney Campbell
 1953 Michael Howard
 1958 Arthur Wills
 1990 Paul Trepte
 2019 Edmund Aldhouse

Assistant Organists

 ????-1857 Mr. Bailey  (afterwards organist of Holy Trinity Church, Coventry)
 ????-1865 William J. Kempton
 George Legge
 William George Price (later organist to the City of Melbourne)
 1903–1906 Frederick Chubb 
 1906–1909 Harold Carpenter Lumb Stocks
 1911–1915 Edwin Alec Collins
 1927–1929 Guillaume Ormond(afterwards organist of Truro Cathedral)
William Bean
 1939 C. P. R. Wilson
 1945–1949 Russell Missin
 1949–1958 Arthur Wills (later organist)
 1958–1961 Christopher Scarf
 1961–1964 Michael Dudman
 1964–1966 Anthony Greening
 1968–1972 Roger Judd (afterwards Master of the Music at St Michael's College, Tenbury)
 1973–1976 Gerald Gifford
 1977–1989 Stephen Le Prevost
 1989–1991 Jeremy Filsell
 1991–1996 David Price (now organist at Portsmouth Cathedral)
 1996–1998 Sean Farrell
 1999–2002 Scott Farrell
 2002 Jonathan Lilley (now Director of Music at Waltham Abbey)
 2013 Edmund Aldhouse
 2019 Glen Dempsey

Directors of the Girl Choristers

 2006–2008 Louise Reid
 2008 Sarah MacDonald
 2009–2010 Louise Reid
 2010–present Sarah MacDonald

Assistant Organists of the Girls' Choir

 2006–2008 Edward Taylor (now Assistant Organist at Carlisle Cathedral)
 2008–2012 Oliver Hancock (now Director of Music at St Mary's Warwick)
 2012–2014 Alexander Berry (now Director of Music at Bradford Cathedral)
 2015–2017 Alexander Goodwin (now at St John's School Leatherhead as Head of Music Performance & Choral Music)
 2017–2021 Aaron Shilson (now Assistant Director of Music at Llandaff Cathedral)
 2021–present Jack Wilson (Graduate Organ Scholar)

Exeter Cathedral

Notable organists at Exeter Cathedral include composer and hymn writer Samuel Sebastian Wesley, educator Sir Ernest Bullock and conductor Sir Thomas Armstrong.

Organists / Directors of Music

 1586 Matthew Godwin
 1591 Arthur Cocke
 1609 John Lugge
 1665 Theodore Coleby
 1674 Henry Hall
 1686 Peter Passmore and John White
 1693 Richard Henman
 1741 John Silvester
 1753 Richard Langdon
 1777 William Jackson
 1804 James Paddon
 1835 Samuel Sebastian Wesley
 1842 Alfred Angel
 1876 Daniel Joseph Wood
 1919 Ernest Bullock (later knighted, and Organist of Westminster Abbey)
 1928 Thomas Armstrong (later knighted, and Principal of the Royal Academy of Music)
 1933 Alfred William Wilcock
 1953 Reginald Moore
 1957 Lionel Frederick Dakers (later Director of the Royal School of Church Music)
 1973 Lucian Nethsingha
 1999 Andrew Millington
 2016 Timothy Noon

Assistant Organists (Organist from 1999)

 1856 H. G. Halfyard
 1861–1870 W. Pinney
 1861?–1868 Graham Clarke (later organist of St Andrew's, Plymouth)
 ????–1880? Edward Ellis Vinnicombe
 1881–1889 Ernest Slater
 Frederick Gandy Bradford
 ????–1898 Walter Hoyle (later organist of Coventry Cathedral)
 1900–1906 Revd Arnold Duncan Culley
 1906–1918 F. J. Pinn
 1919–1927 Ernest Bullock (later organist here, subsequently knighted and Organist of Westminster Abbey)
 1929–1937 William Harry Gabb (later Organist of H.M. Chapels Royal & Sub Organist at St Paul's Cathedral, London)
 1937–1940 John Norman Hind
 1945–1946 John Norman Hind
 1946–     Edgar S. Landen
 1950–1955 Howard Stephens
 1956–1961 Stuart Marston Smith
 1961–1969 Christopher Gower (later Master of the Music at Peterborough Cathedral)
 1969–2010 Paul Morgan (titled 'Organist' in 1999)

Assistant Directors of Music

 2010 David Davies
 2016 Timothy Parsons
 2021 James Anderson-Besant

Assistant Organists

 1994–2016 Stephen Tanner (Assistant Organist)

Gloucester Cathedral

Notable among the organists of Gloucester Cathedral are Samuel Sebastian Wesley (his final cathedral appointment) and composers and choral conductors of the Three Choirs Festival, Sir Arthur Herbert Brewer, Herbert Sumsion and John Sanders.

Organists
The known organists of the cathedral are listed below. In modern times, the most senior post has become known as Director of Music; only these names are recorded here.

 1582 Robert Lichfield
 1620 Elias Smith
 1620 Philip Hosier
 1638 Berkeley Wrench
 1640 John Okeover
 1662 Robert Webb
 1665 Thomas Lowe
 1666 Daniel Henstridge
 1673 Charles Wren
 1679 Daniel Roseingrave
 1682 Stephen Jeffries
 1710 William Hine
 1730 Barnabas Gunn
 1743 Martin Smith
 1782 William Mutlow
 1832 John Amott
 1865 Samuel Sebastian Wesley
 1876 Charles Harford Lloyd
 1882 Charles Lee Williams
 1897 Herbert Brewer
 1928 Herbert Sumsion
 1967 John Sanders
 1994 David Briggs
 2002 Andrew Nethsingha
 2007 Adrian Partington

Assistant Organists

 1701–1710 William Hine  (later organist of Gloucester Cathedral)
 Walter Brooks
 1862–1865 John Alexander Matthews
 ????-1873 Henry John Vaughan
 1879–1880 George Robertson Sinclair  (later organist at Truro Cathedral and Hereford Cathedral)
 1880–1882 A. Herbert Brewer 
 George Washbourn Morgan
 James Capener
 1896 A. Herbert Brewer (later organist of Gloucester Cathedral)
 1898-1900-???? Ivor Morgan
 ????-1906 S.W. Underwood (afterwards organist at Stroud parish church)
 1907–1913 Ambrose Robert Porter  (later organist of Lichfield Cathedral)
 1915–???? Harold C. Organ
 ca. 1919 Charles Williams
 1920–1926 Reginald Tustin Baker  (later organist of Sheffield Cathedral)
 1926-1917 William O Minay  (later organist of Wigan Parish Church)
 1927–1932 Arthur John Pritchard
 1932–1937 (Alfred) Melville Cook (later organist of Hereford Cathedral)
 1938 W. Lugg
 ????-1945 Herbert William Byard 
 Peter Stuart Rodway
 1948–1954 Donald Frederick Hunt (later organist of Worcester Cathedral)
 1954–1958 Wallace Michael Ross  (later organist of Derby Cathedral)
 1958–1963 John Sanders
 Richard Latham
 ?-1975 John Francis Clough (later assistant organist of St Albans Cathedral)
 1975–1983 Andrew Millington (later organist of Guildford Cathedral and Exeter Cathedral)
 1983–1990 Mark Blatchly
 1990–1998 Mark Lee
 1998–2002 Ian Ball
 2002–2008 Robert Houssart
 2008–2012 Ashley Grote (later Director of Music Norwich Cathedral)
 2012–2013 Anthony Gowing
 2014–present Jonathan Hope (previously Organ Scholar at Southwark Cathedral and Winchester Cathedral)

Guildford Cathedral
Organists at Guildford Cathedral have included choral director Barry Rose and the composer Philip Moore.

Organists

 1927 John Albert Sowerbutts (later Honorary Secretary of the Royal College of Organists)
 1946 Peter Goodman (later organist of Holy Trinity Church, Hull)
 1951 Ronald Walter Dussek
 1961 Barry Rose (later Master of the Choir St Paul's Cathedral, London and Master of the Music at St Albans Cathedral)
 1974 Philip Moore (later organist of York Minster)
 1983 Andrew Millington (later Director of Music at Exeter Cathedral)
 1998 Stephen Farr (later Director of Chapel Music at Worcester College, Oxford)
 2008 Katherine Dienes-Williams

Sub-Organists

 1927–1940 Walter William Lionel Baker
 1954–???? Harry Taylor
 1960-1961 Roger Moffatt
 1961-1962 Gordon Mackie
 1962–1965 Peter Moorse
 1965-1970 Gavin Williams
 1970–1977 Anthony Froggatt (later Organist of Portsmouth Cathedral)
 1977–1989 Peter Wright  (later Organist of Southwark Cathedral)
 1989–2002 Geoffrey Morgan  (later Organist of Christchurch Priory)
 2002–2003 Louise Reid  (later Director of Ely Cathedral Girls' Choir)
 2003–2009 David Davies  (later Assistant Director of Music at Exeter Cathedral)
 2009–2017 Paul Provost (later Rector Chori of Southwell Minster)
 2017–present Richard Moore

Hereford Cathedral

Notable organists of Hereford Cathedral include the 16th-century composers  John Bull and  John Farrant,  briefly, Samuel Sebastian Wesley (his first cathedral appointment), the conductor and advocate of British composers Meredith Davies and the editor of Allegri's Miserere, Ivor Atkins.

Organists

 1517 William Woode
 1527 Richard Palmer
 1536 John Slade
 1538 John Hodges
 1581 Thomas Mason (Master of the Choristers)
 1582 John Bull
 1586 Thomas Warrock(e) (see Fitzwilliam Virginal Book)
 1586 Thomas Mason (acting organist)
 1591 John Fido (1st tenure)
 1592 John Farrant
 1593 John Fido (2nd tenure)
 1595 John Gibbs
 1596 John Fido (3rd tenure)
 1597 William Inglott (until 1609 or later) (see Fitzwilliam Virginal Book)
 1630 Hugh Davis (possibly earlier)
 1660 John Badham
 1688 Henry Hall
 1707 Henry Hall, junior
 1714 Edward Thompson
 1720 Henry Swarbrick
 1754 Richard Clack
 1779 William Perry
 1789 Miles Coyle (formerly organist of St Laurence's Church, Ludlow)
 1805 Charles James Dare
 1818 Aaron Upjohn Hayter
 1820 John Clarke Whitfeld
 1832 Samuel Sebastian Wesley
 1835 John Hunt
 1843 George Townshend Smith
 1877 Langdon Colborne
 1889 George Robertson Sinclair
 1918 Percy Clarke Hull
 1950 (Albert) Meredith Davies
 1956 (Alfred) Melville Cook
 1966 Richard Lloyd
 1974 Roy Massey
 2001 Geraint Bowen

Assistant Organists

 1883–1884 F. J. Livesey
 1884–1889 Allan Paterson
 1890–1893 Ivor Atkins  (later organist of Worcester Cathedral)
 1892–1895 Edgar C. Broadhurst  (later organist of St. Michael's College, Tenbury)
 1898-c. 1912  Percy Hull (served in the First World War until 1918 when he became organist of Hereford Cathedral)
 c. 1912 W. R. Carr (probably replaced Percy Hull during the war)
 1919–1923 Ernest Willoughby
 1924–1935 Reginald Harry West  (later organist of St Patrick's Cathedral, Armagh)
 1935–1940 Colin Archibald Campbell Ross (later organist at St Paul's Cathedral, Melbourne and Newcastle Cathedral)
 1940–1942 Christopher John Morris
 1942–1949 Colin Mann
 1950–1953 Ross Fink
 1953–1958 Michael Illman
 1958–1962 Michael Burton  (later organist of the Church of St John the Baptist, Frome)
 1962–1967 Roger Fisher  (later organist of Chester Cathedral)
 1968–1984 Robert Green
 1985–1988 David Briggs  (later organist of Truro Cathedral and Gloucester Cathedral)
 1989–1994 Geraint Bowen  (later organist of St Davids Cathedral and Hereford Cathedral)
 1995–1998 Huw Williams  (later sub-organist at St Paul's Cathedral)
 1998–present Peter Dyke

Leicester Cathedral

Notable organists at Leicester Cathedral have included Gordon Slater and Jonathan Gregory.

Organists and Directors of Music

 Richard Hobbs (to 1753) (afterwards organist St Martin in the Bull Ring) 
 William Boulton (to 1765)
 Anthony Greatorex 1765 – c. 1772 (father of Thomas Greatorex, who became organist at Westminster Abbey)
Martha Greatorex 1772–1800 (daughter of Anthony Greatorex)
 Sarah Valentine 1800–1843 (sister of Ann Valentine, who was organist at St Margaret's Church, Leicester)
 Mrs Mary Lee Scott (née Hewitt) 1843-1870
 John Morland 1870–1875
 Charles Hancock 1875–1927
 Gordon Archbold Slater 1927–1931 (subsequently organist at Lincoln Cathedral 1931–1966)
 George Charles Gray 1931–1969 (previously organist at St Michael le Belfrey, York and St. Mary le Tower, Ipswich
 Peter Gilbert White 1969–1994 (previously Assistant Organist of Chester Cathedral 1960–1962)
 Jonathan Gregory 1994–2010 (previously organist of St Anne's Cathedral, Belfast, now Director of Music of the UK Japan Choir)
 Christopher Ouvry-Johns 2011–present (formerly Choral Director in the Roman Catholic Diocese of Leeds)

Assistant Organists and Assistant Directors of Music

 Frederick William Dickerson
 Dennis Arnold Smith 1918
 Stanley Vann 1932 (subsequently Master of the Music at Peterborough Cathedral 1953–1977)
 Thomas Bates Wilkinson 1933
 Wallace Michael Ross 1951 (subsequently assistant organist at Gloucester Cathedral 1954–1958, and organist of Derby Cathedral 1958–1982)
 Sidney Thomas Rudge 1955
 Robert Prime 1965
 Geoffrey Malcolm Herbert Carter 1973 (subsequently organist of St Mary's Church, Humberstone)
 David Cowen 1995 (now Associate Organist of Leicester Cathedral)
 Simon Headley 1999–2018 (also Acting Director of Music in the Autumn of 2010 between the departure of Jonathan Gregory and the appointment of current Director of Music, Christopher Ouvry-Johns)
 Rosie Vinter 2019–present

Lichfield Cathedral
Notable organists of Lichfield Cathedral include the 17th-century composer  Michael East, and the musical educator and choral conductor Sir William Henry Harris who conducted at the coronations of both Elizabeth II and George VI

Organists

 1618 Michael East
 1638 Henry Hinde
 1662 Mr Lamb (Snr)
 1688 Mr Lamb (Jnr)
 1723 George Lamb III
 1750 John Alcock
 1766 William Brown
 1807 Samuel Spofforth
 1864 Thomas Bedsmore
 1881 John Browning Lott
 1925 Ambrose P. Porter
 1959 Richard Greening
 1978 Jonathan Rees-Williams
 1992 Andrew Lumsden
 2002 Philip Scriven
 2010 Martyn Rawles
This post was restructured in September 2010.

Directors of Music

 2010 Ben and Cathy Lamb
 2016 Ben Lamb

Assistant Organists

 1849–1864 Thomas Bedsmore  (organist from 1864)
 1865–1866 James C. Culwick
 William Grainger
 Montague Spinney
 Percival J. Illsley
 1890–1897 Clement Charlton Palmer  (later organist of Canterbury Cathedral)
 ????-1895 Herman Brearley
 1902–1909 H. Rose
 1909–1911 Thomas Milton Sowell
 1911–1919 William Henry Harris (later successively organist of New College, Oxford and Christ Church Cathedral, Oxford, later knighted and organist of St George's Chapel, Windsor Castle)
 1919–1924 Montague Herbert Spinney
 1927–1947 Edgar Morgan
 ????-1960 Frayling
 1950–1952 PW Read
 1952–1955 Paul H Matthews
 1955–1959 Donald Cox
 1959 J W Sharwood
 1960–1967 Robert Green
 1968–1974 Peter Noyce
 1975–1986 Peter King  (later organist of Bath Abbey)
 1986–1994 Mark Shepherd (later organist of the Collegiate Church of St Mary, Warwick)
 1994–2002 Robert Sharpe (later organist of Truro Cathedral and York Minster)
 2002–2007 Alexander Mason 7 (later organist of St Davids Cathedral)
 2007 Cathy Lamb and 2008 Martyn Rawles
This post was restructured in September 2010.

Lincoln Cathedral
Notable organists of Lincoln Cathedral have included the Renaissance composers William Byrd and John Reading and the biographer of Mendelssohn, William Thomas Freemantle.

Organists

 1439 John Ingleton
 1489 John Davy
 1490 John Warcup
 1506 Leonard Pepir
 1508 Thomas Ashwell
 1518 John Watkins
 1524 John Gilbert
 1528 Robert Dove
 1538 Thomas Appilby
 1539 James Crowe
 1541 Thomas Appilby
 1552 William Monk
 1559 Thomas Appilby
 1563 William Byrd
 1572 Thomas Butler
 1593 William Boys
 1594 John Hilton
 1599 Thomas Kingston
 1616 John Wanlesse
 1660 Thomas Mudd
 1663 Andrew Hecht
 1670 John Reading
 1693 Thomas Hecht
 1693 Thomas Allinson
 1704 George Holmes
 1721 Charles Murgatroy
 1741 William Middlebrook
 1756 Lloyd Raynor
 1784 John Hasted
 1794 George Skelton
 1850 John Matthew Wilson Young
 1895 George Bennett
 1930 Gordon Archbold Slater
 1966 Philip Marshall
 1986 David Flood
 1988 Colin Walsh

From 2003 the post was divided: Colin Walsh became Organist Laureate and Aric Prentice was appointed Director of Music.

Director of Music
 2003 Aric Prentice

Assistant Organists
Articled pupils fulfilled the role of assistant organist until 1893 when the Chapter formalised the position of assistant organist.

 ????–1594 John Hilton
 1857–1858 William James Young  (brother of the organist) (later organist of St. Mary's Church, Horncastle, then St. Bartholomew's Church, Wilmslow, Cheshire)
 ????–1864 W.H. Wish (later organist of St Andrew's Church, Newcastle upon Tyne)
 Richard Winter
 1870 William Thomas Freemantle (later organist of St. Andrew's Church, Sharrow)
 ????–1881 Edwin Charles Owston (later organist of St. Andrew's Church, Derby)
 ????–1882 Ernest Wood
 William Rose Pullein
 1893–1894 Frank Pullein (later organist of St Giles' Church, Wrexham)
 1895–1899 Edgar Cyril Robinson  (later organist of Gainsborough Parish Church and then Wigan Parish Church)
 1899–1904 Harry Smith Trevitt
 ????–1903 John Pullein  (later organist of St. Peter's Church, Harrogate)
 19 July 1921 Frederick David Linley Penny
 1922–1926 William Wells Hewitt  (later organist of Church of the Holy Trinity, Stratford-upon-Avon)
 1926–1930 Edward Francis Reginald Woolley  (later organist of Church of St Mary Magdalene, Newark-on-Trent)
 1931–1936 Willis Grant  (later organist of St. Philip's Cathedral, Birmingham)
 1936–???? Clifford Hewis
 1975–1992 Roger Bryan  (later organist of Church of St. Mary Magdalene, Newark–on-Trent)
 1992–1993 Andrew Post  (later Director of Music, Christchurch Priory)
 1993–1994 James Antony Vivian  (acting)
 1994–1999 Jeffrey Makinson  (later assistant organist of Manchester Cathedral)
 1999–2003 Simon Morley
 Julian Thomas
 Stephen Bullamore (later organist of Waltham Abbey)
 Jamie John Hutchings (later Director of Music at Headington School, Oxford)
 2005–2007 Richard Apperley (later Assistant Director of Music at Saint Paul's Cathedral, Wellington in New Zealand)
 2008–2011 Benjamin Chewter (later Assistant Director of Music at Chester Cathedral)
 2011–2014 Claire Innes-Hopkins (later Assistant Organist of Rochester Cathedral)
 2014–2019 Hilary Punnett
 2019- Alana Brook

Assistant Directors of Music

 2003–2014 Charles Harrison (later organist of Chichester Cathedral)
 2014–2015 Sachin Gunga (acting)
 2015– Jeffrey Makinson

Liverpool Cathedral
Notable organists at Liverpool Cathedral have included Edgar Robinson and Ian Tracey.

Directors of Music of Liverpool Cathedral

 1910–1915 Frederick William Burstall (of the Lady Chapel)
 1924–1947 Edgar Cyril Robinson
 1947–1982 Ronald Woan
 1982–2007 – Ian Tracey 
 2008–2017 David Poulter 
 2017–2021 Lee Ward 
 2021-current Stephen Mannings

Organists of Liverpool Cathedral

1910–1915 Frederick William Burstall (of the Lady Chapel)
1915–1955 Walter Henry Goss-Custard 
1955–1980 Noel Rawsthorne 
1980– Ian Tracey

London, St Paul's Cathedral
The many distinguished musicians who have been organists, choir masters and choristers at St Paul's Cathedral include the composers John Redford, Thomas Morley, John Blow, Jeremiah Clarke and John Stainer, while well known performers have included Alfred Deller, John Shirley-Quirk, Anthony Way and the conductors Charles Groves and Paul Hillier and the poet Walter de la Mare.

Organists and Directors of Music

 c.1525–1547 John Redford (also Almoner)
 1547 Philip ap Rhys (until c.1559)
 1573 Henry Mudd
 1587? – 1592? Thomas Morley
 1598 Thomas Harrold
 1619 John Tomkins
 1638–1642 Albertus Bryne
 1660–1668 Albertus Bryne
 1687 Isaac Blackwell
 1699 Jeremiah Clarke (also Almoner 1704-7)
 1707 Richard Brind
 1718 Maurice Greene
 1756 John Jones
 1796 Thomas Attwood
 1838 Sir John Goss
 1872 Sir John Stainer
 1888 Sir George Clement Martin MVO
 1916 Charles Macpherson
 1927 Sir Stanley Marchant CVO
 1936 Sir John Dykes Bower CVO
 1968 Christopher Dearnley LVO
 1990 John Scott LVO (Organist & Director of Music)
 2004 Malcolm Archer
 2007 Andrew Carwood MBE (Director of Music)

Sub-Organists and Assistant Organists

 ????-1838 George Cooper (father)
 1838–1876 George Cooper (son)  (also Organist HM Chapel Royal)
 1876–1888 George Clement Martin MVO  (subsequently Organist)
 1888–1895 William Hodge
 1895–1916 Charles Macpherson  (subsequently Organist)
 1916–1927 Stanley Marchant CVO  (subsequently Organist)
 1927–1946 Douglas Edward Hopkins  (subsequently Organist Peterborough Cathedral; later Organist Canterbury Cathedral)
 1946–1974 Harry Gabb CVO  (also Organist, Choirmaster & Composer HM Chapel Royal)
 1974–1984 Barry Rose OBE  (Master of the Choir 1977–84; later Master of Music St Albans Cathedral)
 1985–1990 John Scott LVO  (subsequently Organist and Director of Music; later Director of Music St Thomas, Fifth Avenue)
 1990–1998 Andrew Lucas (now Master of Music, St Albans Cathedral)
 1998–2008 Huw Williams (subsequently Organist, HM Chapel Royal; now Organist Bath Abbey)
In 2007 the posts of Organist and Director of Music were separated, the Sub-Organist post being re-titled Organist & Assistant Director of Music in September 2008.

Organist and Assistant Director of Music
 2008-2021 Simon Johnson

Assistant Sub-Organists and Sub-Organists

 1953–1956 Gerald Wheeler
 1956–1958  Derek Holman CM
 1958–1966 Richard Popplewell LVO (later Organist, Choirmaster & Composer HM Chapel Royal)
 1966–1967 Timothy Farrell  (later Organist, Choirmaster & Composer HM Chapel Royal)
 1967–1978 Christopher Herrick  (later Sub-Organist Westminster Abbey)
 1978–1985 John Scott LVO (simultaneously Assistant Organist Southwark Cathedral; later Sub-Organist of St Paul's)
 1985–1990 Andrew Lucas  (subsequently Sub-Organist, later Organist of St Albans Cathedral)
 1990–1991 Martin Baker  (later Sub-Organist & Acting Organist Westminster Abbey; lately Master of Music Westminster Cathedral)
 1992–2000 Richard Moorhouse  (subsequently Organist & Master of the Choristers Llandaff Cathedral)
 2000–2006 Mark Williams  (subsequently Director of Music Jesus College, Cambridge, now Informator  Choristarum, Magdalen College, Oxford)
 2006–2008 Tom Winpenny (now Assistant Master of Music St Albans Cathedral)

In 2007 the posts of Organist and Director of Music were separated, the Assistant Sub-Organist post being re-titled Sub-Organist in April 2008 to reflect the increased demands and prominence of the role.

Sub-Organists
 2008–2014 Timothy Wakerell (subsequently Assistant Organist New College, Oxford)
 2014–2017 Peter Holder (now Sub Organist Westminster Abbey)
 2018– William Fox

Almoners and Masters of the Choristers

 1315–1329 William of Tolleshunt
 fl. 1345 John de Hadley
 fl. 1358 John de Ware
 ????–1534 Thomas Hickman
 1530–1540 John Redford  (also Organist)
 before 1552 Thomas Mulliner
 1559–1576 Sebastian Westcote  (Vicar Choral)
 1584–1589 Thomas Giles
 1596 Edward Kerkham
 1599–1612 Edward Pearce or Piers
 1613–1624 John Gibbs
 1626–1742 Martin Peerson
 1661–1775 Randall Jewett
 1686–1687 Michael Wise
 1687–1693 John Blow
 1693–1707 Jeremiah Clarke (also Organist)
 1707–1748 Charles King  (Vicar Choral)
 1748–1773 William Savage  (Vicar Choral)
 1773–1793 Robert Hudson  (Vicar Choral)
 1793–1800 Richard Bellamy  (Vicar Choral)
 1800–1812 John Sale  (Vicar Choral)
 1812–1846 William Hawes (Vicar Choral)
 1846–1853 William Hale
 1853–1872 J. H. Coward (Minor Canon)

The title of Almoner was abolished in 1872, while the post of Master of the Choristers was held by a succession of Vicars Choral:
 1846–1858 William Bayley 
 1858?–1867 Henry Buckland
 1867–1874 Frederick Walker (resigned upon establishment of St Paul's Cathedral School on the present basis)
 1874–1876 George Clement Martin (subsequently Sub-Organist & then Organist)

The training of the choristers was then entrusted to the Organist and his deputies until –
 1977–1984 Barry Rose OBE 1977–1984 (Master of the Choir)
In 1990 the post was re-united with that of Organist under John Scott

Some notable Choristers and Vicars Choral

16th century
 John Redford (Vicar Choral) composer
 William Mundy (Vicar Choral), composer.
 Peter Philips (chorister), composer.
17th century
 Adrian Batten (Vicar Choral), composer.
18th century
 Jonathan Battishill (chorister), composer.
 William Boyce (chorister), composer.
 Maurice Greene (chorister), composer and Organist of St Paul's Cathedral.

19th century
 William Cummings (chorister), composer and organist.
 Frederick Ranalow (chorister), baritone and actor
 John Stainer (chorister), Organist of St Paul's Cathedral and Professor of Music at Oxford University.

20th century
 Simon Russell Beale (chorister), actor
 Maurice Bevan (Vicar Choral), composer
 Alastair Cook (chorister), cricketer.
 Alfred Deller (Vicar Choral), counter-tenor.
 Jimmy Edwards (chorister), actor.
 Gerald English (Vicar Choral), tenor.
 Charles Groves (chorister), conductor.
 Paul Hillier (Vicar Choral), conductor.
 Robin Holloway (chorister), composer.
 Neil Howlett (chorister), opera singer and teacher.
 James Lancelot (chorister), sometime Organist and Lay Canon of Durham Cathedral.
 Walter de la Mare (chorister), poet and novelist.
 Stephen Oliver (chorister), composer.
 Julian Ovenden (chorister), actor and singer.
 John Shirley-Quirk (Vicar Choral), bass-baritone.
 Robert Tear (Vicar Choral), tenor and conductor.
 Anthony Way (chorister), treble.

Manchester Cathedral
Notable organists at Manchester Cathedral have included Frederick Bridge and Sydney Nicholson.

Organists

 1635 John Leigh
 1637 William Garter
 1666 William Turner
 1670 William Keys
 1679 Richard Booth
 1696 Edward Tetlow
 1702 James Holland
 1704 Edward Edge
 1714 Edward Betts
 1767 John Wainwright
 1768 Robert Wainwright
 1775 Richard Wainwright
 1783 Grifiith James Cheese
 1804 William Sudlow
 1831 William Sudlow and Joseph John Harris
 1848 Joseph John Harris
 1869 Frederick Bridge (later Sir Frederick Bridge organist of Westminster Abbey)
 1875 James Kendrick Pyne
 1908 Sydney Nicholson (later Sir Sydney Nicholson organist of Westminster Abbey and founder of the Royal School of Church Music)
 1919 Archibald W. Wilson
 1943 Norman Cocker
 1954 Allan Wicks (later organist of Canterbury Cathedral)
 1962 Derrick Edward Cantrell
 1977 Robert Vincent
 1980–1981 Stephen Pinnock (organist)
 1980–1996 Stuart Beer (Master of the Choir)
 1981–1992 Gordon Stewart (Organist)
 1992–1996 Christopher Stokes (Organist)
 1996– Christopher Stokes (Organist and Master of the Choristers)

Assistant organists

 1869–1871 Joseph Cox Bridge (later organist of Chester Cathedral)
 1876 R.H. Wilson
 ?–1881 Minton Pyne
 Samuel Myerscough
 Richard Henry Mort
 1895–1896 Herbert C. Morris (later organist of St David's Cathedral)
 Harold Mitchell Dawber (later organist St George’s Stockport)
 Frank Radcliffe (later organist of St. Wulfrum's Church, Grantham, and St. Mary's Church, Nottingham)
 1908–1912 Richard Henry Coleman (later organist of Peterborough Cathedral)
 1912–1919 Ernest Bullock (later organist of Exeter Cathedral and Westminster Abbey)
 1919 Arnold Goldsbrough
 1920–1922 Norman Cocker (also 1923–1943, afterwards organist here)
 1922–1923 Thomas Armstrong (afterwards organist of St. Peter's Church, Eaton Square, London, later organist of Exeter Cathedral
 1943–1946 William Oswald Minay
 1946– Edward Fry
 1950– Douglas Steele
 1961– John Wenlock Gittins
 1968–1970 Jonathan Bielby (afterwards organist of Wakefield Cathedral)
 1970–1974 Brian Hodge
 1972–1974 John Wenlock Gittins (also, Alto Lay Clerk at this time)
 1975–1980 Stephen Drew Pinnock (afterwards Director of Music at Ardingly College)
 1996–1999 Matthew Owens
 1999–2014 Jeffrey Makinson
 2015 Geoffrey Woollatt

Newcastle Cathedral
Notable organists at Newcastle Cathedral have included Charles Avison and Colin Ross.

Organists

 1687 Samuel Nichols
 1736 Charles Avison
 1770 Edward Avison
 1776 Matthias Hawdon
 1789 Charles Avison Jnr
 1795 Thomas Thompson
 1834 Dr Thomas Ions
 1857 William Ions
 1894 George Huntley
 1895 John Jeffries
 1918 William Ellis
 1936 Kenneth Malcolmson
 1955 Colin Ross
 1967 Dr. Russell Missin
 1987 Timothy Hone
 2002 Scott Farrell
 2008 George Richford (Acting)
 2009 Michael Stoddart
 2016 Ian Roberts

Assistant organists
 1928–1933 Thomas Christy (afterwards organist of Hexham Abbey)
 1936 Clifford Harker (afterwards organist at Bristol Cathedral)
 1959–1960 Michael Bryan Hesford (afterwards organist at Brecon Cathedral)
 1960–1980 Graeme East (afterwards Organist St Chad's Gateshead then Warnham Parish Church. d.2010)
 1980–1984 Keith Downie (Lay Clerk and sub-Assistant 1972–1980 & 1984–1988): now St Helen's Gateshead
 1984–2009 Michael Dutton (afterwards Director of Music at Dame Allan's Schools)

Director of the Girls Choir and Sub-Organist
 2008-2010 George Richford, Founder Director of the Girls Choir
 2010–2012 David Stevens (later Organist and Master of the Choristers at Belfast Cathedral, and Sub-Assistant Organist at Wells Cathedral)

Assistant Director of Music
2012–2015 James Norrey (became Assistant Sub-Organist at Rochester Cathedral)
2015 Kris Thomsett

Norwich Cathedral
Notable organists of Norwich Cathedral have included Zechariah Buck and Brian Runnett, and composers Thomas Morley, Heathcote Dicken Statham, Alfred R. Gaul and Arthur Henry Mann.

Organists and Masters of the Music

 1313 Adam the Organist
 1424 Thomas Wath
 1445 John Skarlette
 1542 Thomas Grewe
 1560 Edmund Inglott
 1583 Thomas Morley
 1593 William Baker
 1594 William Cobbold
 1608 William Inglott
 1621 Richard Gibbs
 1661 Richard Ayleward
 1664 Thomas Gibbs
 1666 Richard Ayleward
 1670 Thomas Pleasants
 1689 James Cooper
 1721 Humphrey Cotton
 1749 Thomas Garland
 1808 John Christmas Beckwith
 1809 John Charles Beckwith
 1819 Zechariah Buck
 1877 Francis Edward Gladstone
 1881 Frederick Cook Atkinson
 1885 Frank Bates
 1928 Heathcote Dicken Statham
 1967 Brian Runnett (died while in office)
 1971 Michael Nicholas
 1994 David Anthony Cooper
 1995 Neil Taylor (Acting)
 1996 David Dunnett
 2007 David Lowe (Master of Music), David Dunnett continues as organist
 2011 David Dunnett (Acting Organist and Master of the Music)
 2012 Ashley Grote (Master of Music), David Dunnett continues as organist

Assistant Organists

 1815–1819 Zechariah Buck (afterwards organist)
 Thomas Wolsey White
 ????-1845 George Augustus Löhr
 1850s Alfred R. Gaul
 1850s Frederick Cook Atkinson
 1855–1877 Edward Bunnett
Arthur Henry Mann (later organist and director of music, King's College, Cambridge)
 Philip Chignell
 A. Miller Potts
 1895 C. H. Duffield
 Claude Alan Forster
 Herbert J. Dawson
 1903–1905 Alfred Heath
 1906 Richard John Maddern-Williams
 1907–1908 Nelson Victor Edwards
 1910–1914 Wilfrid Greenhouse Allt (later organist of St Giles' Cathedral, Edinburgh)
 1978–1983 Malcolm Archer (later successively organist of Bristol Cathedral, Wells Cathedral and St Paul's Cathedral, London and organist and director of music at Winchester College) 
 1983–1990 Adrian Lucas (later organist of Worcester Cathedral)
 1990–1997 Neil Taylor (later organist of Sheffield Cathedral)
 Katherine Dienes-Williams (later organist of Guildford Cathedral)
 Julian Thomas
 Ben Giddens
 Tom Primrose

Oxford, Christ Church
First among the notable organists of Christ Church, Oxford is the Renaissance composer John Taverner. Other significant composers and conductors are Basil Harwood, Sir William Henry Harris, Sir Thomas Armstrong, Sydney Watson, Francis Grier, Simon Preston and Nicholas Cleobury.

Organists

 1530 John Taverner
 1564 Bartholomew Lant
 1611 Matthew White
 1613 William Stonard
 1630 Edward Lowe
 1682 William Husbands
 1690 Charles Husbands
 1691 Richard Goodson (Sr)
 1718 Richard Goodson (Jr)
 1741 Richard Church
 1776 Thomas Norris
 1790 William Crotch
 1807 William Cross
 1825 William Marshall
 1846 Charles William Corfe
 1882 Charles Harford Lloyd
 1892 Basil Harwood
 1909 Henry George Ley
 1926 Noel Edward Ponsonby
 1929 William Henry Harris
 1933 Thomas Armstrong
 1955 Sydney Watson
 1970 Simon Preston
 1981 Francis Grier
 1985 Stephen Darlington
 2018 Steven Grahl

</ref>===Sub-Organists===
Assistant Organist (1753–1990)

 1753 William Walond Sr.
 1924 Sidney Thomas Mayow Newman
 1928 ?
 1938 Ivor Christopher Banfield Keys
 1940 ?
 1943 Alec Wyton (later Organist, Cathedral of St. John the Divine, New York City, USA)
 1946 Ivor Christopher Banfield Keys
 1947 ?
 1953 Harrison Oxley (later organist of St Edmundsbury Cathedral)
 1955 ?
 1957 Anthony Crossland (later organist of Wells Cathedral)
 1958 Michael John Smith (later organist of Llandaff Cathedral)
 1961 ?
 1972 Nicholas Cleobury
 197? Francis Grier
 1983 Catherine Ennis
 1984 Robin Bowman
 1986 Simon Lawford

Sub-Organist (1990–present)

 1990 Stephen Farr
 1996 David Goode
 2001 Clive Driskill-Smith
 2020 Benjamin Sheen

Precentors
 1938–1945 Wilfrid Oldaker

Peel Cathedral (Isle of Man)
Organists at Peel Cathedral have included the following.

Organists and Choirmasters

 1983 Mike Porter
 1986 Bernard Clark
 1991 Mark Roper
 1992 Stephen Dutton
 1993 Edward Coleman
 1995 Harvey Easton
 2001 Mike Porter

Between 1991 and 1994 the job was combined with the Head of Music position at King Williams College.

Organists and Directors of Music

 2008 Donald Roworth
 2012 Peter Litman

Associate Organist

 2018–present Stuart Corrie

Peterborough Cathedral
Notable organists of Peterborough Cathedral have included Stanley Vann, Sir Malcolm Sargent and Sir Thomas Armstrong.

Masters of the Music

 1540 Richard Storey
 1569 John Tyesdale
 1574 Richard Tiller
 1584 John Mudd
 1631 Thomas Mudd
 1632 David Standish
 1643 Vacant
 1661 David Standish
 1677 William Standish
 1691 Roger Standish
 1714 James Hawkins
 1750 George Wright
 1773 Garter Sharp
 1777 James Rogers
 1784 Richard Langdon
 1785 John Calah
 1799 Samuel Spofforth
 1808 Thomas Knight
 1812 Edmund Larkin
 1836 John Speechley
 1870 Dr Haydn Keeton
 1921 Dr Richard Henry Coleman
 1944 Charles Cooper Francis
 1946 Douglas Edward Hopkins (later Organist of Canterbury Cathedral)
 1953 Dr Stanley Vann
 1977 Christopher Gower
 2004 Andrew Reid  (Director of Music)
 2013 Robert Quinney (later Organist and Director of Music New College, Oxford)
 2014 Steven Grahl
 2018– Tansy Castledine

Assistant Masters of the Music

 Samuel Round
 1895 George Pattman
 1900–1902 H. M. Goodacre
 1902–1903 Arthur Griffin Claypole
 1905–1910 Charles Cooper Francis  (later appointed Master of the Music)
 1911–1914 Malcolm Sargent  (Articled Pupil/Assistant to Haydn Keeton, later knighted)
 1915–1917 Thomas Armstrong (Articled Pupil/Assistant, subsequently Organist of Exeter Cathedral, later knighted, Principal of the Royal Academy of Music)
 1918–1925 Eric John Fairclough
 1930–1931 J. Durham Holl
 1932–? R. Shield
 ca. 1938 Derek John Clare
 ca. 1938 Desmond Swinburn
 1950–1953 John Malcolm Tyler (later Assistant Organist at Canterbury Cathedral)
 1954–1955 Philip Joseph Lank  (later Organist of St Wulfram's Church, Grantham)
 1956–1959 Malcolm Ernest Cousins (later Organist of St. Peter and St. Paul's Church, Mansfield)
 1960 Eric Howard Fletcher  (later Professor of Music in USA)
 Richard Latham (later Assistant Organist at Gloucester Cathedral)
 1964–1971 Barry Ferguson  (later Organist of Rochester Cathedral)
 1971–1980 Andrew Robert Newberry
 1980–1986 Simon Lawford  (later Director of Music at St George's Cathedral, Perth)
 1986–1992? Gary Sieling  (later Director of Music at St Peter's Church, Nottingham and Bromley Parish Church)
 1993–1995 Simon Bowler
 1994–2007 Mark Duthie  (later Organist of Brecon Cathedral, subsequently Director of Music at Carlisle Cathedral)
 1998–2002 Thomas Moore  (Assistant Organist, later Director of Music at Wakefield Cathedral)
 2002–2007 Oliver Waterer  (Assistant Organist, later Organist of St Davids Cathedral)
 2007–2011 Francesca Massey  (Assistant Director of Music, later Sub Organist of Durham Cathedral)
 2011–2020 David Humphreys
 2020– Christopher Strange

Plymouth Cathedral 
Organists at Plymouth Cathedral have included the following.

Organists & Directors of Music 
 1990 Neville Allen
 1996 Robert Osmond (formerly Director of Music at Sacred Heart and S Thérèse, Paignton)
 1998 Kevin Holmes (formerly Director of Music at the Birmingham Oratory)
 2001 Christopher Fletcher (formerly Director of Music at Totnes Parish Church)
 2020 Robert Osmond (formerly Director of Music at this Cathedral – returning for a second term)

Assistant Organists 
 1996–1998 Brian Apperson (formerly Director of Music at St Augustine's, Kilburn, London NW6)

Organists 
 1995–1997 Timothy J Lewis (formerly an Anglican Priest and now a Catholic Priest & Canon Precentor of this Cathedral)
 1950s Webster Mansfield (formerly Organist at Holy Cross Plymouth)

Portsmouth Cathedral
Notable organists at Portsmouth Cathedral have included Adrian Lucas and David Price.

Organists

 1927 Hugh Burry
 1933 T. H. Newboult
 1944 John Davison
 1959 Maxwell Menzies
 1964 Peter Stevenson
 1968 Christopher Gower
 1977 Anthony Froggatt
 1990 Adrian Lucas
 1996 David Price

Sub-Organists

 1930 Mr Pease
 1963 Hugh Davis
 1978 David Thorne
 1999 Rosemary Field
 2005 Marcus Wibberley
 2012 Oliver Hancock
 2018 Sachin Gunga

Ripon Cathedral
Notable organists of Ripon Cathedral have included composers Charles Harry Moody and Ronald Edward Perrin.

Organists

 1447 Thomas Litster (priest)
 1478 Lawrence Lancaster
 1511 John Watson
 1513 William Swaine
 1520 Adam Bakehouse
 1540 William Solber
 1548 Interregnum
 1613 John Wanlass
 ca. 1643 Interregnum
 1662 Henry Wanlass
 1670 Wilson
 1674 Alexander Shaw
 1677 William Sorrell
 1682 John Hawkins
 1690 Thomas Preston (sen)
 1731 Thomas Preston (jun)
 1748 William Ayrton
 1799 William F. M. Ayrton (elder son)
 1802 Nicholas T. D. Ayrton (younger son)
 1823 John Henry Bond
 1829 George Bates
 1874 Edwin John Crow
 1902 Charles Harry Moody, CBE (formerly organist of Holy Trinity Church, Coventry)
 1954 Lionel Frederick Dakers
 1957 Philip Marshall
 1966 Ronald Edward Perrin
 1994 Kerry Beaumont
 2002 Andrew Bryden (Acting)
 2003 Simon Morley
 2003 Andrew Bryden
 2020 Peter Wright (Acting)
 2022 Ronny Krippner

Assistant Organists/Assistant Directors of Music

 Edward Brown
 1876–1881 Henry Taylor
 ???? J. William-Render
 William Rains
 William Edward Cave
 Edgar Alfred Lane
 ????-1887 Herbert Arthur Wheeldon
 1887–1890 Charles Morton Bailey
 Edgar Watson
 ca. 1908 C. Richards
 David Lamb
 1925–1927 Leonard Bagguley (formerly assistant organist of St Mary's Church, Nottingham, afterwards organist of Paignton Parish Church)

The post of assistant organist was informal until 1928 when it made official.
 1928–1935 Dennis Cocks
 1935–1939 Alfred H. Allsop
 World War Two (1939–1947)
 1947–1952 Alex Forrest
 1952–1955 Paul Mace
 1955–1956 Keith Bond
 1956–1958 Peter Anthony Stanley Stevenson
 1958–1963 Laurence Gibbon
 1963–1974 Alan Dance
 1974–1986 Marcus Huxley (later organist of St. Philip's Cathedral, Birmingham)
 1986–1998 Robert Marsh
 1998–2003 Andrew Bryden  (then organist)
 2003-2004 Stephen Power (Acting)
 2004–2008 Thomas Leech
 2009–2013 Edmund Aldhouse
 2013–2014 Ben Horden (acting)
 2014– Tim Harper

Rochester Cathedral
Among the composers, conductors and concert performers who have been organists at Rochester Cathedral are  Bertram Luard-Selby, Harold Aubie Bennett, Percy Whitlock and William Whitehead.

Organists

 1559 James Plomley
 1588 Roper Blundell
 1599 John Williams
 1614 John Heath
 1672 Charles Wren
 1674 Daniel Henstridge
 1699 Robert Bowers
 1704 John Spain
 1721 Charles Peach
 1753 Joseph Howe
 1781 Richard Howe
 1790 Ralph Banks
 1841 John Larkin Hopkins
 1856 John Hopkins
 1900 Bertram Luard-Selby
 1916 Charles Hylton Stewart
 1930 Harold Aubie Bennett
 1956 Robert Ashfield
 1977 Barry Ferguson
 1994 Roger Sayer
 2008 Scott Farrell
 2018 Adrian Bawtree (Interim Director of Music)
 2019 Francesca Massey
 2022 Adrian Bawtree

Assistant Organists

 Henry Edmund Ford
 1850–1856 Philip Armes (later organist of Durham Cathedral)
 1859–1865 Frederick Bridge, (later Sir Frederick Bridge organist of Westminster Abbey)
 Alfred Alexander
 ca.1868 Joseph Bridge  (later organist of Chester Cathedral)
 1899–1901 Glanville Hopkins
 1902–1908 Hector E. Shallcross
 1919–1921 Alfred H. Allen
 1921–1930 Percy Whitlock  (then organist of St Stephen's Church, Bournemouth)
 1930–1977 James Alfred Levett
 1977–1981 David Poulter  (subsequently Director of Music at Coventry Cathedral, Chester Cathedral, and Liverpool Cathedral)
 1982–1989 Paul Hale  (later organist and rector chori of Southwell Minster)
 1989–1994 Roger Sayer
 1994–1998 William Whitehead
 1998–2001 Sean Farrell
 2001–2002 James Eaton (acting)
 2002–2006 Edmund Aldhouse
 2006–2010 Dan Soper
 2010–2014 Samuel Rathbone
 2014–2018 Claire Innes-Hopkins
 2018 Jeremy Lloyd

Cathedral Organists

 2008–2013 Roger Sayer
 2014–2015 Adrian Bawtree

Assistant Sub-Organists

 2015 Ben Bloor
 2016–2018 James Norrey

St Albans Cathedral

The posts of organist and master of the music at St Albans Cathedral have been held by a number of well-known musicians, including Peter Hurford, Stephen Darlington and Barry Rose. Andrew Lucas is the current Master of the Music. Since 1963 the cathedral has been home to the St Albans International Organ Festival, winners of which include Dame Gillian Weir, Thomas Trotter and Naji Hakim.

Organists

 1302 Adam
 1498 Robert Fayrfax
 1529 Henry Besteney
 1820 Thomas Fowler
 1831 Edwin Nicholls
 1833 Thomas Fowler
 1837 Thomas Brooks
 1846 John Brooks
 1855 William Simmons
 1858 John Stocks Booth
 1880 George Gaffe
 1907 Willie Lewis Luttman
 1930 Cuthbert E. Osmond
 1937 Albert Charles Tysoe
 1947 Meredith Davies
 1951 Claude Peter Primrose Burton
 1957 Peter Hurford
 1978 Stephen Darlington
 1985 Colin Walsh
 1988 Barry Rose
 1998 Andrew Lucas

Assistant Organists

 1908–1909 John Cawley
 1921–1930 George C. Straker
 1936–1939 Sydney John Barlow
 1945–1951 Frederick Carter
 1951–1970 John Henry Freeman
 1970–1975 Simon Lindley
 1972-1973 Anthony Jennings
 1975–1976 John Clough
 1976–2001 Andrew Parnell
 2001–2008 Simon Johnson (later Assistant Director of Music St Paul's Cathedral)
 2008–present Tom Winpenny

St Edmundsbury Cathedral

This list of organists of St Edmundsbury Cathedral also includes organists of the parish church of St James before it was elevated to Cathedral status in 1914 with the creation of the Diocese of St Edmundsbury and Ipswich.

Organists and Directors of Music

 1760 Mr Nair
 1785 Thomas Harrington
 1815 John Harrington
 1841 Philip Harrington
 1863 Frederick Fearnside
 1877 Mr Sydenham
 1883 Edward Iles
 1892 Revd J Lord
 1896 Harold Shann
 1937 Percy Hallam
 1958 Harrison Oxley
 1985 Paul Trepte
 1990 Mark Blatchly
 1993 Mervyn Cousins
 1997 James Thomas
 2020-2021 Vacant 
 2021 Timothy Parsons

Assistant Organists and Assistant Directors of Music

 1867–1877 B Fearnside
 1917 Wilfred Mothersole
 1971 Mary Slatter
 1973 John Scott Whiteley
 1975 Geoffrey Hannant
 1986 Mervyn Cousins
 1993 Scott Farrell
 1999 Michael Bawtree
 2004 Jonathan Vaughn
 2007 David Humphreys
 2011 Daniel Soper
 2016 Alexander Binns
 2019 Richard Cook

Salisbury Cathedral
Among the notable organists of Salisbury Cathedral have been a number of composers and well-known performers including  Bertram Luard-Selby, Charles Frederick South, Sir Walter Galpin Alcock, Sir David Valentine Willcocks, Douglas Guest, Christopher Hugh Dearnley, Richard Godfrey Seal and the BBC presenter Simon Lole.

Organists

 1463 John Kegewyn
 1563 Robert Chamberlayne
 1568 Thomas Smythe
 1587 John Farrant (Senior)
 1592 Richard Fuller
 1598 John Farrant (Junior)
 1602–1610 John Holmes (previously organist of Winchester Cathedral)
 1618 Edward Tucker
 1629 Giles Tompkins
 1668–1687 Michael Wise
 1689 Peter Isaacke
 1692–1698 Daniel Roseingrave
 1700 Anthony Walkley
 1718 Edward Thompson
 1746 John Stevens
 1781 Robert Parry
 1792 Joseph Corfe
 1804 Arthur Thomas Corfe
 1863 John Elliott Richardson
 1881 Bertram Luard-Selby
 1883 Charles Frederick South
 1916 Sir Walter Galpin Alcock, MVO
 1947 David Valentine Willcocks, CBE, MC (later knighted)
 1950 Douglas Albert Guest
 1957 Christopher Hugh Dearnley
 1968 Richard Godfrey Seal
 1997 Simon Lole
 2005 David Halls (Director of Music)

Assistant Organists

 1845?–1863 John Elliott Richardson  (then organist)
 Thomas Bentinck Richardson (later organist of St Mary's Church, Bury St Edmunds
 1881–1884 Albert Edward Wilshire
 1886–1889 George Street Chignell
 1917 Herbert Howells
 1917–1927 Cuthbert Edward Osmond  (later organist of St Albans Cathedral)
 1933–1947 Reginald Moore  (later organist of Exeter Cathedral)
 1947–1950 John Charles Stirling Forster
 1947–1954 Ronald Tickner
 1954–1957 Christopher Hugh Dearnley (later organist here, subsequently organist of St Paul's Cathedral, London)
 1957–1966 Richard Hey Lloyd
 1967–1974 Michael John Smith  (then organist of Llandaff Cathedral)
 1974–1978 Jonathan Rees-Williams  (later organist of Lichfield Cathedral and St George's Chapel, Windsor Castle)
 1978–1985 Colin Walsh (later organist of St Albans Cathedral and Lincoln Cathedral)
 1985–2005 David Halls (later organist, now Director of Music)
 2005–2011 Daniel Cook (Assistant Director of Music, later Sub-Organist of Westminster Abbey, now Organist of Durham Cathedral)
 2011–2012 Vacant
 2012–present John Challenger  (Assistant Director of Music)

Sheffield Cathedral
Notable organists at Sheffield Cathedral have included Edwin Lemare and Reginald Tustin Baker.

Organists and Directors of Music

 1805 John Mather
 1810 Jonathan Blewitt
 1811 Robert Bennett
 1819 John Camidge
 1819 Mr Gledhill
 1820 Joseph Bottomley
 1860 George Henry Smith
 1875 Thomas Tallis Trimnell
 1886 Edwin Lemare
 1892 Thomas William Hanforth
 1937 Reginald Tustin Baker
 1967 Graham Hedley Matthews
 1991 Paul Brough
 1994 Simon Lole
 1997 Neil Taylor
 2016 Joshua Hales (acting)
 2017 Tom Corns
 2019 Joshua Stephens (acting, appointed Master of Music from March 2020, resigned June 2020)

 2021 Ian Seddon (acting)

Assistant Directors of Music

 2013 Joshua Hales
 2018 James Kealey (Interim)
 2018 Joshua Stephens
 2020 Ian Seddon

Assistant Master of the Music

 1992–1995 Tim Horton
 1995–1999 Chris Betts
 1999 Mark Pybus
 1999–2005 Peter Heginbotham
 2005–2012 Anthony Gowing

Sub Organists

 ?–1976 Hubert Stafford
 1975-1979 David G Read
 1979–1985 Paul Parsons
 1989–1992 Martin Colton

Southwark Cathedral
Among the organists of Southwark Cathedral are Edgar Tom Cook, known for his lunchtime organ broadcasts on the BBC, and the organ designer and noted teacher Ralph Downes.

Organists

 1897 Alfred Madeley Richardson
 1908 Edgar Tom Cook
 1953 Sidney Schofield Campbell
 1956 Harold Dexter
 1968 Ernest Herbert Warrell
 1976 Harry Wakefield Bramma
 1989 Peter Wright
 2019 Ian Keatley

Assistant Organists

 F. Stanley Winter
 1908–1917 Charles Edgar Ford
 1917–1922 Francis W. Sutton
 1922 J.C. Bradshaw 1922
 1923–1925 Ralph William Downes (later Organist of the London Oratory, Brompton, organ consultant and designer, including designer and curator of the Royal Festival Hall organ)
 1934–1935 Philip Miles
 1936 Ernest F.A. Suttle
 1937–1954 Ernest Herbert Warrell
 1955–1956 William Allen Humpherson
 1957–1959 Denys Darlow
 1959–1962 John Flower, Alan Dance, John Oxlade
 1962–1970 Arthur Newell
 1971–1974 Christopher Jenkins
 1975–1978 Nicholas Woods
 1978–1985 John Scott
 1985–1988 Andrew Lumsden
 1988–1997 Stephen Layton
 1997 Stephen Disley

Southwell Minster
At Southwell Minster, the term Rector Chori is used rather than Director of Music, or Master of the Choristers. It literally means Ruler of the Choir, and is an historic title.

Rectores Chori

 1499 Lawrence Pepys
 1519 Rev George Vincent
 1568 George Thetford
 1582 John Mudd
 1584 Thomas Foster
 1586 William Colbecke
 1594 John Beeston
 1596 Edward Manestie
 1622 Francis Dogson
 1628 John Hutchinson
 1661 Edward Chappell
 1690 George Chappell
 1699 William Popeley
 171? William Lee
 1754 Samuel Wise
 1755 Edmund Ayrton
 1764–1781 Thomas Spofforth
 1818 Edward Heathcote
 1835 Frederick Gunton
 1841 Chappell Batchelor
 1857 Herbert Stephen Irons
 1872 Cedric Bucknall
 1876 William Weaver Ringrose
 1879 W. Arthur Marriott
 1888 Robert William Liddle
 1918 Harry William Tupper
 1929 George Thomas Francis
 1946 Robert Ashfield
 1956 David Lumsden 
 1959 Kenneth Beard
 1989 Paul Robert Hale
 2016 Simon Hogan (acting)
 2017 Paul Provost (formerly Sub-Organist of Guildford Cathedral)

Organists

Assistant Organists:
 ????-1861 W.D. Hall
 W.L. Dodd 1861–1865 (afterwards organist of St Alkmund's Church, Derby)
 ca. 1868 E.D. Hoe
 ca. 1870 H. Nicholson
 ????-1885 G. Fletcher
 1890–1897 Alfred Winterbotham
 1897–1902 Lawrence Frederick Baguley
 1903–1904 Sydney Weale    (formerly assistant organist at the Church of St. Mary Magdalene, Newark-on-Trent)
 Oswald Steele
 Cecil Wyer ???? – 1919
 1958–1994 Peter Wood
 1994–2002 Philip Rushforth   (now Director of Music at Chester Cathedral)
 2002–08 Simon Bell   (later Assistant Director of Music at Winchester Cathedral, now Director of Music of the Schola Cantorum at Tewkesbury Abbey)
In 2008 the title of Assistant Organist was replaced with Assistant Director of Music, in line with other Cathedrals.
Assistant Directors of Music:
 2008–2012 Philip White-Jones   (previously Assistant Organist at Winchester Cathedral)
 2012–2019 Simon Hogan  (previously Organ Scholar at St Paul's Cathedral)
 2019–present Jonathan Allsopp (previously Organ Scholar at Westminster Cathedral)

Truro Cathedral
The Diocese of Truro was established in 1876 and Truro Cathedral was consecrated in 1887. The parish church of St Mary the Virgin occupied the site before the cathedral was built, and had an organ: its organists included Charles William Hempel and his son Charles Frederick Hempel.

Organists and Masters of the Choristers

 1881 George Robertson Sinclair (later organist of Hereford Cathedral : the G. R. S. of Elgar's Enigma Variations)
 1890 Mark James Monk
 1920 Hubert Stanley Middleton (later organist of Ely Cathedral and Trinity College, Cambridge)
 1926 John Dykes Bower (later Sir John Dykes Bower organist of St Paul's Cathedral, London)
 1929 Guillaume Ormond
 1971 John Charles Winter (later Organist Emeritus)
 1989 David Briggs (later organist of Gloucester Cathedral)
 1994 Andrew Nethsingha (currently Director of Music at Westminster Abbey)
 2002 Robert Sharpe (currently Director of Music at York Minster)
 2008 Christopher Gray

Assistant Organists

 1885–1886 Ivor Atkins (later knighted, and Organist of Worcester Cathedral)
 1902–1907 Frederick Rowland Tims
 1907–1911 William Stanley Sutton
 1911 Mr. Hall
 Donald Behenna
 1922–1926 Gerald Hocken Knight (later Organist of Canterbury Cathedral and subsequently Director of the Royal School of Church Music)
 Arthur William Baines
 1950–1971 John Charles Winter (later Organist and Organist Emeritus)
 1971–1991 Henry Doughty
 1991–2000 Simon Morley
 2000–2008 Christopher Gray
 2008–2017 Luke Bond
 2017–2019 Joseph Wicks
 2019–2020 Michael Butterfield
 2020–present Andrew Wyatt

Wakefield Cathedral
Organist of Wakefield Cathedral have included the following.

Organists

 1886 Joseph Naylor Hardy
 1930–1945 Newell Smith Wallbank
 1945–1970 Percy George Saunders
 1970–2010 Jonathan Bielby MBE
 2010–2020 Thomas Moore
 2020–2021 James Bowstead (Acting)
 2021- 2022 Ed Jones
 2023 - James Bowstead (Interim)

Assistant Organists

 1896–1900 William Frederick Dunnill
 1961–1971 John Holt
 1975–1983 Peter David Gould
 1983–1985 Gareth Green
 1985–1991 Keith Wright
 1991–1996 Sean Farrell
 1996–2002 Louise Reid (née Marsh)
 2002–2010 Thomas Moore
 2010 Daniel Justin
 2011–2015 Simon Earl
 2015–2017 Sachin Gunga
 2018–2020 James Bowstead
 2020–2021 Robert Pecksmith
 2021- James Bowstead

Wells Cathedral
The first record of an organ at Wells Cathedral dates from 1310, with a smaller organ, probably for the Lady Chapel, being installed in 1415. In 1620 a new organ, built by Thomas Dallam, was installed at a cost of £398 1s 5d, however this was destroyed by parliamentary soldiers in 1643 and another new organ was built in 1662,
which was enlarged in 1786,
and again rebuilt in 1855, a substantial early work of 'Father' Henry Willis.
In 1909–1910 a new organ was built by Harrison & Harrison with the best parts of the old organ retained (approximately one-third of the stops being by Willis),
and this has been maintained by the same company since.

Organists

 1416–1418 Walter Bagele (or Vageler)
 1421–1422 Robert Cator
 1428–1431 John Marshal
 1437–1462 John Marchell
 1461–1462 John Menyman (joint)
 1461–1462 Richard Hygons (joint)
 1497–1507 Richard Hygons
 1507–1508 Richard Bramston
 1508 John Clawsy (or Clavelleshay)
 1514 William Mylwhard
 1515–1531 Richard Bramston
 1534–1538 John Smyth
 1547–1554 Nicholas Prynne
 1556–1557 John Marker
 1558 Robert Awman
 1559–1562 William Lyde
 1563 Thomas Tanner
 1568 Matthew Nailer
 1587 John Clerk
 1600 Thomas Hunt
 1608 James Weare
 1613 Edmund Tucker
 1614 Richard Brown
 1619–1642 John Oker (or Okeover)
 Commonwealth period (1642-1663)
 1663 John Brown
 1674 Mr Hall
 1674 John Jackson
 1688 Robert Hodge
 1690 John George
 1713 William Broderip
 1726 Joseph Millard
 1727 William Evans
 1741 Jacob Nickells
 1741 John Broderip
 1771 Peter Parfitt
 1773 Robert Parry
 1781 Dodd Perkins
 1820 William Perkins
 1859 Charles Williams Lavington
 1896 Percy Carter Buck
 1899 Revd. Canon Thomas Henry Davis
 1933 Conrad William Eden
 1936 Denys Pouncey
 1971 Anthony Crossland
 1996 Malcolm Archer
 2004 Rupert Gough (acting)
 2005 Matthew Owens
 2020–2022 Jeremy Cole (acting Organist and Master of the Choristers since 2017)

Assistant Organists

 1842–1859 Charles William Lavington
 J. Summers
 c. 1880 Frederick Joseph William Crowe (later organist of Chichester Cathedral) c.1880
 1894–1895 Charles Harry Moody  (then acting organist 1895)
 1896–1897 Frederick William Heck (afterwards organist of Bedminster Parish Church)
 W. J. Bown
 1904–1906  Richard John Maddern-Williams  (later sub-organist of Norwich Cathedral).
 1906 Kenneth J Miller
 1908 F.P. Wheeldon
 Frank W. Porkess
 1920–1925 Marmaduke Conway (later organist of Ely Cathedral)
 1926–1927 C.H. Trevor
 1927–1933 Conrad William Eden (then organist here and later organist of Durham Cathedral)
 1938 J.W. Martindale-Sidwell (later organist of St Clement Danes, London)
 1946–1953 Michael Peterson
 1961–1970 Anthony Crossland (later organist)
 1977–1983 David Anthony Cooper (later organist of Blackburn Cathedral)
 1983–1990 Christopher Brayne (later organist of Bristol Cathedral)
 David Ponsford
 1990–1994 Andrew Nethsingha
 1994–2005 Rupert Gough
 2002–2007 David Bednall  (Senior Organ Scholar 2002 – 2004)
 2007–2017 Jonathan Vaughn
 2017–2019 Jeremy Cole
 2019– James Gough (temporary)
 2020– Alexander Hamilton (Assistant Director of Music)

Sub-Assistant Organists

 2019–2020 David Stevens (formerly Organist and Master of the Choristers of Belfast Cathedral)
 2021 Adam Wilson (formerly Acting Assistant Master of the Music of St Mary’s Episcopal Cathedral, Edinburgh)

Winchester Cathedral
The earliest known organist of Winchester Cathedral is John Dyer in 1402. Later organists include Christopher Gibbons whose patronage aided the revival of church music after the Interregnum, John Reading, Daniel Roseingrave, James Kent, Samuel Sebastian Wesley, the composer of sacred music, who was also responsible for the acquisition of the Cathedral organ, Martin Neary, who arranged the music for the funeral of Diana, Princess of Wales, and choral director David Hill.

Organists
Organists were formerly titled "Organist and Master of the Choristers" then, briefly, "Organist and Master of the Music" and now "Organist and Director of Music"

 1402 John Dyer
 ???? Richard Wynslade
 1572 John Langton
 ???? John Holmes
 1602 John Lante
 1615 George Bath
 1631 Thomas Holmes
 1638 Christopher Gibbons
 1661 John Silver
 1666 Randolph Jewitt
 1675 John Reading
 1681 Daniel Roseingrave
 1693 Vaughan Richardson
 1729 John Bishop
 1737 James Kent
 1774 Peter Fussell
 1802 George William Chard (also Mayor of Winchester)
 1849 Samuel Sebastian Wesley
 1865 George Benjamin Arnold
 1902 William Prendergast
 1933 Harold Rhodes
 1949 Reginald Alwyn Surplice
 1972 Martin Neary
 1988 David Hill
 2002 Andrew Lumsden

Assistant Organists
Sometimes the appointment has been as "Sub-organist" or, in recent years, "Assistant Director of Music"

 1787–1802 George William Chard (later Organist)
 1851–1854 George Mursell Garrett (later Organist of Madras Cathedral, subsequently Organist of St John's College, Cambridge and Organist to Cambridge University)
 1863–?? Thomas Somerford
 ????-1869 E.H. Birch
 1876 Charles Lee Williams (later Organist of Llandaff Cathedral and Gloucester Cathedral)
 William Prendergast (later Organist)
 1898–?? Alfred Ernest Floyd
 E. Gilbert
 1902–1904 Louis H. Torr
 1906 George C. Macklin
 1906–1913 Howard Roscoe Eady
 1908–?? James Frederick Parsons 
 Henry William Radford
 1912–1921 Henry William Stubbington (later Organist of St Martin in the Bull Ring, Birmingham)
 1919 Hilda Bird
 Horace Hawkins (later organist of Chichester Cathedral)
 W. Brennand Smith
 Cyril John Tucker Fogwell 
 Gillian Skottowe (now Gillian Earl)
 1958–1967 Graham Hedley Matthews (later Organist of Sheffield Cathedral)
 1967–?? Clement McWilliam 
 1975–1985 James Lancelot (later Organist and Master of the Choristers at Durham Cathedral, also Lay Canon and now Lay Canon Organist Emeritus there also, from September 2018, Interim Director of Music at Worcester Cathedral)
 1985–1991 Timothy Byram-Wigfield (later successively Organist of St Mary's Cathedral, Edinburgh (Episcopal), Jesus College, Cambridge, St. George's Chapel, Windsor Castle, and All Saints, Margaret Street, London) 
 1991–1996 David Dunnett (later Organist and Master of the Music at Norwich Cathedral)
 1996–1998 Stephen Farr (later Organist and Master of the Choristers at Guildford Cathedral,  Organist of Worcester College, Oxford and from April 2020 Organist and Director of Music All Saints, Margaret Street, London)
 1999–2002 Philip Scriven (later Organist and Master of Choristers at Lichfield Cathedral)
 2002–2008 Sarah Baldock (later Organist and Master of Choristers at Chichester Cathedral)
 2003–2008 Philip White-Jones (later Assistant Director of Music at Southwell Minster)
 2008 Richard McVeigh  (Assistant Organist)
 2008–2012 Simon Bell (Assistant Director of Music, later Director of Music of the 'Schola Cantorum' at Tewkesbury Abbey)
 2012–2021 George Castle (Assistant Director of Music)
 2017 Richard Moore (Assistant Organist)
 2017- Claudia Grinnell (Assistant Organist 2017-2021) (Sub Organist 2021- )
 2022-  Joshua Stephens (Sub Organist)

Worcester Cathedral
Organists of Worcester Cathedral have included Sir Ivor Atkins, Douglas Guest, Christopher Robinson, the composers Thomas Tomkins, William Hayes, Hugh Blair, and conductors Sir David Willcocks, Donald Hunt and Adrian Lucas.

Organists (and Directors of Music from 2012)

 1240 Thomas the Organist
 1415 T. Hulet
 1468 Richard Grene
 1484 John Hampton
 1522 Daniel Boyse
 1541 Richard Fisher
 1569 John Golden
 1581 Nathaniel Giles
 1585 Robert Cotterell
 1590 Nathaniel Patrick
 1595 John Fido
 1596 Thomas Tomkins
 1649 Vacant
 1661 Giles Tomkins
 1662 Richard Browne
 1664 Richard Davis
 1686 Vaughan Richardson
 1688 Richard Cherington
 1724 John Hoddinott
 1731 William Hayes
 1734 John Merifield
 1747 Elias Isaac
 1793 Thomas Pitt
 1806 Jeremiah Clark
 1807 William Kenge
 1813 Charles E. J. Clarke
 1844 William Done
 1895 Hugh Blair
 1897 Sir Ivor Atkins
 1950 David Willcocks (later knighted)
 1957 Douglas Guest
 1963 Christopher Robinson
 1974 Donald Hunt
 1996 Adrian Lucas
 2012 Christopher Allsop (Acting Director of Music)
 2012–2018 Peter Nardone 
 2019 Samuel Hudson

Assistant Organists (and Assistant Directors of Music from 2012)

 1835–1844 William Done (later organist)
 1846–1847 John Roberts Boulcott
 c. 1860 Alfred James Caldicott
 1865 Robert Taylor
 ????-1876 William Edward Wadeley
 1879 Mr. Garton
 James Henry Caseley (later organist of Holy Trinity Church, Stratford-upon-Avon)
 Henry Holloway
 1887–1895 Hugh Blair (later organist)
 1893–1899 Frank Alfred Charles Mason
 1893–1896 George Street Chignell
 1904–1909 Edgar Thomas Cook (later organist of Southwark Cathedral)
 ????-1912 Alexander E. Brent Smith
 1912–1962 Edgar F.Day
 1962–1963 Christopher Robinson (later organist; then successively organist of St. George’s Chapel, Windsor Castle and St John's College, Cambridge)
 1963–1976 Harry Bramma  (later organist of Southwark Cathedral)
 1976–1981 Paul Trepte  (later organist of Ely Cathedral)
 1981–1991 Adrian Partington  (later organist of Gloucester Cathedral)
 1991–1998 Raymond Johnston (later Canon Musician of St Mark’s Episcopal Cathedral, Minneapolis)
 1998–2004 Daniel Phillips
 2004–2018 Christopher Allsop (subsequently Assistant Director of Music, King's School, Worcester)
 2018– Nicholas Freestone

Sub-Assistant Organists (and Voluntary Choir Choirmasters)

 2007–2008 Simon Bertram
 2008–2012 George Castle (later Assistant Director of Music at Winchester Cathedral)
 2012–2014 James Luxton (later Assistant Director of Music at Liverpool Metropolitan Cathedral)
 2014–2016 Justin Miller
 2017–2019 Richard Cook
 2019–2021 Ed Jones

Organists of the Worcester Cathedral Voluntary Choir

 1981–2021 John Wilderspin

York Minster

Among the notable organists of York Minster are four members of the Camidge family who served as cathedral organists for over 100 years, and a number of composers including James Nares, Edwin George Monk, John Naylor, Thomas Tertius Noble and Francis Jackson.

Organists
The organists of York Minster have had several official titles, including "Master of the Music"; the job description roughly equates to that of Organist and Master of the Choristers. They will have an Assistant Organist, who may be titled simply "Organist".  
The names of Organists prior to 1633 have been copied from the list of Organists of York Minster on the wall of the North Transept.

 1475 John Austan
 1484 John Symson
 1510 John Usher
 1527 Robert Holmes
 1531 Thomas Kirkby
 1541 John Thorne
 1573 Henry Thorne
 1598 Cuthbert Byas
 1605 Henry Farrande
 1607 William Browne
 1616 Thomas Kingston
 1633 James Hutchinson 
 1662 J. H. Charles
 1667 Thomas Preston
 1691 Thomas Wanless
 1695 J.Heath
 1715 Charles Murgatroyd
 1721 William Davies
 1722 Charles Quarles
 1734 James Nares
 1756 John Camidge
 1799 Matthew Camidge
 1842 John Camidge
 1848 Thomas Simpson Camidge
 1859 Edwin George Monk
 1883 John Naylor
 1897 Thomas Tertius Noble 
 1913 Sir Edward Bairstow
 1946 Francis Jackson
 1983 Philip Moore
 2008 Robert Sharpe

Assistant Organists

 1842–1848 Thomas Simpson Camidge
 ????-1878 Edward Johnson Bellerby
 ????-1879 Mark James Monk
 1891–1892 Thomas William Hanforth
 1892 Charles Legh Naylor
 ????-1902 Frederick Flaxington Harker
 1902–1906 Edwin Fairbourn
 1906–1910 William Green
 1910–1914  Cyril Francis Musgrove
 1917–1923 Harold Aubie Bennett
 1924–1929 J. Lawrence Slater
 1929–1941, 1946 Owen Le Patourel Franklin
 1946 Francis Jackson (later Organist and Master of the Music)
 1947–1954 Allan Wicks (later organist of Canterbury Cathedral)
 1954–1957 Eric Parsons
 1957–1966 Ronald Edward Perrin (later organist of Ripon Cathedral)
 1966–1967 Peter J. Williams
 1969–1971 A. Wilson Dixon
 1971–1975 Geoffrey Coffin
 1976–2002 John Scott Whiteley  (Organist, 2001–2010)
 2010–2016 David Pipe (later organist of Leeds Cathedral)
 2016 Benjamin Morris

Assisting Organists

 2016–2018 Jeremy Lloyd
 2018–2020 Christopher Strange

See also
 List of musicians at Welsh cathedrals
 List of Westminster Abbey organists
 List of Masters of the Children of the Chapel Royal

Notes

References

English cathedrals, List of musicians at
Lists of English people
English music history
Cathedrals in England
Anglican church music